The Nordic Cup was a cup competition for club teams from Denmark, Finland, Norway, and Sweden staged on one occasion, starting in June 1959 and ending on 31 July 1962.

Summary
In December 1958, the group Stævnet proposed a cup competition for club teams from the Nordic countries at a Scandinavian football conference in Copenhagen, which was decided and 16 teams were invited. The teams responding to the invitation were IFK Norrköping, Djurgården, IFK Göteborg, GAIS, Malmö FF, Hälsingborg, and AIK from Sweden, Viking FK, Skeid, and Fredrikstad from Norway, and Vejle, KB, AB, Frem, and Skovshoved from Denmark, while the Finnish teams only wanted to join as a combination team, which initially was rejected.

Initially the final was scheduled to be played in autumn 1960, but the participating team had problems finding match days and the semi-finals were rescheduled to spring 1961.

The Nordic cup saw low attendances.

On 31 July 1962, the first edition of the cup ended with a final on Stockholm Olympic Stadium between Djurgården of Stockholm and the Helsinki-Alliance, which the Helsinki team won with 1–0 on a penalty in first half, and won the trophy donated by Scandinavian Airlines.

Teams

Results

Round of 16

Matches

Örgryte won 4–2 on aggregate.

KB won 4–3 on aggregate.

IFK Norrköping won 9–3 on aggregate.

AIK won 6–2 on aggregate.

Helsinki-Alliance won 3–2 on aggregate.

Malmö FF won 5–1 on aggregate.

Frem won 5–1 on aggregate.

Djurgården won 8–1 on aggregate.

Quarter-finals
Originally, the matches were supposed to be played before 15 November 1959.

Matches

Helsinki-Alliance won on coin flipping.

Djurgården won 2–0 on aggregate.

IFK Norrköping won 11–4 on aggregate.

Frem won 4–2 on aggregate.

Semi-finals

Matches

Djurgården won 7–3 on aggregate.

Helsinki-Alliance won 5–2 on aggregate.

Final

See also
Royal League

References

Defunct international club association football competitions in Europe
Sport in Scandinavia
1959 in Danish football
1960 in Danish football
1961 in Danish football
1962 in Danish football
1959 in Finnish football
1960 in Finnish football
1961 in Finnish football
1962 in Finnish football
1959 in Norwegian football
1960 in Norwegian football
1961 in Norwegian football
1962 in Norwegian football
1959 in Swedish football
1960 in Swedish football
1961 in Swedish football
1962 in Swedish football
Inter-Nordic sports competitions